Myanmar competed at the 2017 Asian Indoor and Martial Arts Games held in Ashgabat, Turkmenistan from September 17 to 27.

Myanmar sent a delegation consisting of four competitors for two different sports. Myanmar was unable to win a medal in the competition.

Participants

References 

Nations at the 2017 Asian Indoor and Martial Arts Games
2017 in Burmese sport
Myanmar at the Asian Games